Ectoedemia insulata is a moth of the family Nepticulidae. It was described by Edward Meyrick in 1911. It is known from South Africa (it was described from the former Transvaal province).

References

Endemic moths of South Africa
Nepticulidae
Moths of Africa
Moths described in 1911